The  is a third-sector railway company based in Hakodate, Hokkaido, Japan. 

Ownership of the stock is shared in the following proportions: 
Hokkaido Prefecture 80%; 
Hokuto City 11.2%; 
Hakodate City 4.4%; 
Kikonai Town 4.4%.

Dōnan Isaribi Tetsudō Line

The company took control of passenger operations on the Hokkaido Railway Company (JR Hokkaido) Esashi Line between Kikonai Station and Goryōkaku Station following the commencement of operations of the Hokkaido Shinkansen on 26 March 2016.

Stations
All stations are in Hokkaido.
Track: ∥: Double track, ∨: Double track ends, ◇: Passing loop |: No passing loop

Rolling stock
, the company operates a fleet of nine KiHa 40 series diesel multiple unit (DMU) trains formerly owned by JR Hokkaido.

History
On December 24, 2014, the current name was announced. On March 22, 2015, the logo was unveiled. Revenue service commenced in March 2016, in conjunction with the opening of the Hokkaido Shinkansen.

References
This article incorporates material from the corresponding Japanese article.

External links

Railway companies of Japan
Companies based in Hokkaido
Railway companies established in 2005
Japanese companies established in 2005
1067 mm gauge railways in Japan
Japanese third-sector railway lines